Subdoluseps malayana is a species of skink found in Malaysia.

References

Subdoluseps
Reptiles of the Malay Peninsula
Endemic fauna of Malaysia
Reptiles described in 2019
Taxa named by Larry Lee Grismer
Taxa named by Zaharil Duzulkafly
Taxa named by Mohd Abdul Muin
Taxa named by Evan Quah
Taxa named by Benjamin R. Karin
Taxa named by Elyse S. Freitas
Taxa named by Shahrul Anuar